Pedro Pablo Sanguineto (1760 - 1806), also known as Sanguineti, Sangineto or Sanguinetto, was a sailor, geographer, and Spanish governor of the Malvinas Islands (Falkland Islands). He was Spanish governor of the Malvinas Islands in 1791 to 1972, then from 1793 to 1794, and finally in 1795 to 1796.

Sanguineto Bay, in Argentina, was named after him in his honour

References 

 Carta de Pedro Pablo Sanguineto a Nicolás de Arredondo (Documento). Buenos Aires: Archivo General de la Nación Argentina. Sala IX. 16-9-8.
 García Hourcade, J. J. (2009). «Pedro Pablo Sanguineto, cartografió las Malvinas». Atlas de los Exploradores Españoles. Barcelona, España: Editorial Planeta, S. A. y Sociedad Geográfica Española. p. 320. .
 Ratto, H. R. (1930). Actividades marítimas en la Patagonia durante los siglos XVII y XVIII. Gmo. Kraft, ltda. p. 194.

1760 births
1806 deaths
People killed in action
Spanish sailors
Spanish geographers
Politicians from Cartagena, Spain